The 1996–97 season was Stoke City's 90th season in the Football League and 34th in the second tier. It was also Stoke's final season at their Victoria Ground.

After 119 years Stoke were all set to move to a new stadium with the 1996–97 season confirmed as the final season at the Victoria Ground. With Stoke agreeing with the council to pay £6 million towards the cost, manager Lou Macari had no money to spend on new players having to rely on free or cheap transfers and loan signings instead. It was a very inconsistent season results wise as Stoke finished in 12th position with 64 points. The final league match at the Victoria Ground saw a repeat of the first league match against West Bromwich Albion, Stoke won 2–1 with Graham Kavanagh scoring Stoke's final goal at the Vic. Stoke moved to the Britannia Stadium ahead of the 1997–98 season.

Season review

League
The final season at the Victoria Ground was a big milestone in the club's history and was met with mixed reaction from the club's supporters, some of whom were happy to move and some who wanted the Victoria Ground to remain. The first ramifications of the move became clear in the summer of 1996 as a number of players wanted a move away as the club began trying to find the £6 million they need. Nigel Gleghorn and Vince Overson were the first to depart both joining Burnley. Funds were generated by the sale of Graham Potter to Southampton for £300,000 and Lee Sandford to Sheffield United for £450,000. The board did permit Macari to spend £200,000 on Richard Forsyth who became the club's first player signed for a fee since 1994.

With the club losing three very good players the supporters were downbeat about the team's prospects ahead of the 1996–97 season. So an opening five-match unbeaten run took many by surprise and Stoke were early season table-toppers as Macari won the manager of the month award. A 3–0 defeat at Barnsley brought reality back and prompted the signings of Gerry McMahon and Graham Kavanagh and the sale of John Dreyer. There were some serious questions now being raised as to how Stoke could afford the £6 million needed for their new stadium and they found part of the answer as a deal was struck with the Britannia building society who bought the naming rights to the stadium as well as shirt sponsorship for around £1.3 million, meaning the new ground would be known as the Britannia Stadium.

On the pitch Stoke won one match in seven and went from promotion contenders to mid-table also-rans. And with Macari struggling for players he promoted Andy Griffin to the first team as Stoke's away form continued to be dire. They lost eight of their final nine away fixtures scoring just once which was an own goal. However, their home form held up as the landmark games came and went. Stoke won the last evening game and drew the last Saturday match, while the final Potteries derby at the Vic was won 2–0.

The final league match at the Victoria Ground saw a re-run of the first with Stoke coming up against West Bromwich Albion in a carnival atmosphere. Stoke won 2–1 with Gerry McMahon and Graham Kavanagh scoring Stoke's goals. However manager Lou Macari announced he was leaving at the end of the season which was a surprise but he was 'stripped of his duties' before he left and later launched a lawsuit against Peter Coates for wrongful dismissal. Less of a surprise was the departure of Mike Sheron who joined Queens Park Rangers for £2.75 million exactly the amount Stoke needed to make up their contribution to the cost of the new stadium. And so Stoke went into a new era at the Britannia Stadium with no manager and their best player gone.

FA Cup
Stoke suffered a poor defeat at home in the third round losing 1–0 to Stockport County.

League Cup
Stoke edged past Northampton Town and drew Arsenal in the third round. After a 1–1 draw at home Arsenal proved too strong at Highbury running out 5–2 winners.

Final league table

Results

Legend

Football League First Division

FA Cup

League Cup

Friendlies

Squad statistics

References

Stoke City F.C. seasons
Stoke